Ben Provisor (born June 26, 1990 in Stevens Point, Wisconsin) is an American wrestler. He won the 2012 U.S. Olympic Trials at 74 kg GR, and competed at the 2012 Olympics. He also competed at the 2016 Olympics.

Personal life

He is the son of musician Dennis Provisor, former keyboard player for the rock band The Grass Roots.

He is married to wrestler Leigh Jaynes.

He has one child. He attended SPASH high school in Stevens Point WI.

Wrestling career

Provisor is a three-time U.S. Open champion (2011, 2013, and 2018).

He defeated Aaron Sieracki 2 to 1 at the finals of the 2012 U.S. Olympic Trials.

In the 1/8 finals at the 2012 Summer Olympics Provisor was defeated by Zurab Datunashvili of Georgia (0-1, 0-6). Provisor was coached by Olympic silver-medalist and Greco-Roman world champion Dennis Hall.

At the 2016 Olympics, he competed in the men's light-heavyweight (85 kg) division in Greco-Roman wrestling.  He lost to Rustam Assakalov in the second round.

In 2021, Provisor signed to wrestle for the NAIA powerhouse Grand View Vikings.

References

External links

USA Today article
 

1990 births
Living people
American male sport wrestlers
Wrestlers at the 2012 Summer Olympics
Wrestlers at the 2016 Summer Olympics
Olympic wrestlers of the United States
Pan American Games medalists in wrestling
Pan American Games silver medalists for the United States
Wrestlers at the 2011 Pan American Games
Medalists at the 2011 Pan American Games
Pan American Wrestling Championships medalists
20th-century American people
21st-century American people